The King of Tyre was the ruler of Tyre, the ancient Phoenician city in what is now Lebanon. The traditional list of 12 kings, with reigns dated to 990–785 BC, is derived from the lost history of Menander of Ephesus as quoted by Josephus in Against Apion I. 116–127. Josephus asserts that Menander had drawn his list from the chronicles of Tyre itself. Menander-Josephus also contains a list of 9 kings and judges, with reigns dated to 591–532 BC in Against Apion I. 154–160.

Ancient Tyrian rulers based on Hellenic mythology

Late Bronze Age rulers

Kings of the Sidonians (with Tyre as capital), 990–785 BC

The dates for the reconstruction of Menander's Tyrian king list from Abibaal through Pygmalion are established in three places by three independent sources: a Biblical synchronism (Hiram's assistance to Solomon in building the Temple, from 967 BC onwards), an Assyrian record (tribute of Baal-Eser II/Balazeros II to Shalmaneser III in 841 BC), and a Roman historian (Pompeius Trogus, who placed the founding of Carthage or Dido's flight from her brother Pygmalion in the latter's seventh year of reign, in 825 BC, 72 years before the founding of Rome).

Assyrian ascendancy: 8th and 7th centuries BC
The Neo-Assyrian Empire established its control over the area and ruled through vassals who are named in Assyrian records.

Post-Assyrian period
Menander's Tyrian king list also described the period from Ithobaal III through Hiram III. Tyre regained independence with Assyria's demise, although Egypt controlled Tyre during some of the time afterwards. Eventually, Tyre fell under the control of the Neo-Babylonian Empire.

Under control of Babylon 573–539 BC

Shoftim of Tyre

In the 560s the monarchy was overthrown and an oligarchic government established, headed by "judges" or shoftim (cf. Carthage). The monarchy was restored with the ascension of Hiram III to the throne. Josephus mentions these judges in his treatise Against Apion (Book I, §21), and which last judge (Hiram III) is said to have been contemporary with Cyrus. The dates appended by scholars to this last judge's twenty-year reign correspond roughly to the regnal years of Cyrus the Great. Another Persian king who also went by the name Cyrus was Artaxerxes (Cyrus) b. Xerxes the Great, and which, if Josephus referred to him, would push the years of the judges' reign much later.

Under Persian control 539–411 BC
Mattan IV fl. c. 490–480
Boulomenus fl. c. 450
Abdemon c.420–411 BC. He ruled Salamis, in Cyprus.

Under control of Cypriot Salamis 411–374 BC
Evagoras of Salamis, Cyprus. He united Cyprus under his rule and achieved independence from the Persian Empire.

Under Persian control 374–332 BC
Eugoras fl. 340's
Azemilcus c.340–332 BC. He was king during the siege by Alexander the Great.

Under the Greeks and Romans
After Alexander the Great conquered Tyre in 332 BC, the city alternated between Seleucid (Syrian Greek) and Ptolemaic (Egyptian Greek) rule. Phoenicia came under the rule of the Roman Republic in the 1st century BC.

Marion (c. 42 BC) was the Roman tyrant of Tyre.

See also
King of Byblos
King of Sidon
Hiram I, for a discussion of the date of Carthage's foundation
Belus of Tyre, a legendary king of Tyre in Vergil's Aeneid
Pygmalion of Tyre, for inscriptional evidence regarding Pygmalion and Baal-Eser II
Dido of Carthage

References

Tyre
 
Heads of state of Lebanon